Suryaa is a Telugu-language newspaper headquartered in Hyderabad. This newspaper is promoted by Nukarapu Surya Prakash Rao. It is published from seventeen cities in India.

External links 
 http://www.suryaa.com/
 http://news.oneindia.in/2007/10/21/new-telugu-daily-surya-launched-1193203586.html

Telugu-language newspapers
2007 establishments in Andhra Pradesh
Publications established in 2007
Newspapers published in Hyderabad